
Cañapa Lake (Laguna Cañapa) is an endorheic salt lake in the Potosí Department of southwestern Bolivia.

It is located on the Bolivian Altiplano. Its surface area is 1.42 km².

See also

Altiplano region

External links

Lakes of Potosí Department
Endorheic lakes of South America